This is a List of Iranian ambassadors under President Khatami:

 Dr. Hamid Aboutalebi, Ambassador to Australia
 Ali Ahani, Ambassador to Belgium
 Mohammad Hossein Adeli, Ambassador to the United Kingdom
 Mohammad Mehdi Akhoond Zadeh, Ambassador to Austria
 Masoud Edrisi, Ambassador to the Lebanon
 Pirouz Hosseini, Representative and Ambassador to the International Atomic Energy Agency
 Abdol Reza Faraji-rad, Ambassador to Norway
 Mohammad Javad Faridzadeh, Ambassador to the Holy See
 Ali Jazini,  Representative to the Interests Section of the Islamic Republic of Iran in the United States
 Javad Kajouyan Fini, Ambassador to Finland
 Hassan Tajik, Ambassador to Portugal
 Hossein Kamalian, Ambassador to Yemen
 Sadegh Kharazi, Ambassador to France
 Mohammad Keshavarzzadeh, Ambassador to Venezuela
 Morteza Mir-Heydari, Ambassador to Serbia and montenegro
 Hamidreza Nikkar Esfahani, Ambassador to the Republic of Ireland
 Mohammad Ghasem Mohebali, Ambassador to Malaysia
 Esfandiar Omidbakhsh, Representative to the World Trade Organization
 Mohsen Pakaein, Ambassador to the Kingdom of Thailand
 Abolfazl Rahnama Hazavei, Ambassador to Hungary
 Hossein Sadeghi, Ambassador to Saudi Arabia
 Gholamreza Ansari, Ambassador to Russia
 Hossein Talaei, Ambassador to South Korea
 Abbas Talebi-far, Ambassador to Brunei
 Seyed Kamal Sajjadi, Ambassador to Vietnam
 Muhammad Hassan Akhtari, Ambassador to Syria
 Abdollah Norouzi, Ambassador to Sweden
 Fereydoun Verdinezhad, Ambassador to China
 Siavash Zargar Yaghoubi, Ambassador to India
 M. Javad Zarif, Representative and Ambassador to the United Nations
 Bozorgmehr Ziaran, Ambassador to Netherlands
 Ahmad Daniali, Ambassador to Denmark
 Amir Hossein Zamaninia, Ambassador to Malaysia

Lists of ambassadors of Iran